In mathematics, Alexander duality refers to a duality theory presaged by a result of 1915 by J. W. Alexander, and subsequently further developed, particularly by Pavel Alexandrov and Lev Pontryagin. It applies to the homology theory properties of the complement of a subspace X in Euclidean space, a sphere, or other manifold. It is generalized by Spanier–Whitehead duality.

General statement for spheres
Let  be a compact, locally contractible subspace of the sphere  of dimension n. Then if  stands for reduced homology or reduced cohomology, with coefficients in a given abelian group, there is an isomorphism

for all .  Note that we can drop local contractibility as part of the hypothesis, if we use Čech cohomology, which is designed to deal with local pathologies.

Applications 
Recall that a knot is an embedding  and a link is a disjoint union of knots, such as the Borromean rings.
,
giving a method for computing the cohomology groups. Then, it is possible to differentiate between different links using the Massey products.
For example, for the Borromean rings , the homology groups are

Alexander duality for constructible sheaves 
For smooth manifolds, Alexander duality is a formal consequence of Verdier duality for sheaves of abelian groups. More precisely, if we let  denote a smooth manifold and we let  be a closed subspace (such as a subspace representing a cycle, or a submanifold) represented by the inclusion , and if  is a field, then if  is a sheaf of -vector spaces we have the following isomorphism
,
where the cohomology group on the left is compactly supported cohomology. We can unpack this statement further to get a better understanding of what it means.
,
This is useful in algebraic geometry for computing the cohomology groups of projective varieties, and is exploited for constructing a basis of the Hodge structure of hypersurfaces of degree  using the Jacobian ring.

Alexander's 1915 result 
To go back to Alexander's original work, it is assumed that X is a simplicial complex. 

Alexander had little of the modern apparatus, and his result was only for the Betti numbers, with coefficients taken modulo 2. What to expect comes from examples. For example the Clifford torus construction in the 3-sphere shows that the complement of a solid torus is another solid torus; which will be open if the other is closed, but this does not affect its homology. Each of the solid tori is from the homotopy point of view a circle. If we just write down the Betti numbers

1, 1, 0, 0

0, 0, 1, 1

and then shift one to the left to get

0, 1, 1, 0

there is a difficulty, since we are not getting what we started with. On the other hand the same procedure applied to the reduced Betti numbers, for which the initial Betti number is decremented by 1, starts with

0, 1, 0, 0

and gives

0, 0, 1, 0

whence

0, 1, 0, 0.

This does work out, predicting the complement's reduced Betti numbers.

The prototype here is the Jordan curve theorem, which topologically concerns the complement of a circle in the Riemann sphere. It also tells the same story. We have the honest Betti numbers

1, 1, 0

of the circle, and therefore

0, 1, 1

by flipping over and

1, 1, 0

by shifting to the left. This gives back something different from what the Jordan theorem states, which is that there are two components, each contractible (Schoenflies theorem, to be accurate about what is used here). That is, the correct answer in honest Betti numbers is 

2, 0, 0.

Once more, it is the reduced Betti numbers that work out. With those, we begin with

0, 1, 0

to finish with

1, 0, 0.

From these two examples, therefore, Alexander's formulation can be inferred: reduced Betti numbers  are related in complements by

.

References

Further reading
 

Algebraic topology
Duality theories